I'SOT, which stands for In Search of Truth, is a Pentecostal/Bible-based offshoot Christian religious group which was founded in the late 1960s by E. Marie White (also known as E. Marie Tolbert) in Santa Cruz, California. The group was named after a religious tract published by Mrs. White in Gilroy, California.

The I'SOT community's main branch is in Canby, California with a second branch in Coeur d'Alene, Idaho. Canby is known for I'SOT's nativity scenes and they are prominently displayed along the town's main street, California State Route 299.

Several thousand onetime dedicated members have passed through or been a part of the group; a small group of about 70 to 105 active members are still living today in the small rural town which is in Modoc County, California as well as a few other somewhat isolated places in the northwest of the United States .

Criticisms
Allegations of physical and sexual abuse brought against members by clients of I'SOT's group home / foster home during the late 1980s prompted an investigation by the state of California's Department of Social Services Community Care Licensing Division. A final report was filed July 26, 1991. That investigation found a preponderance of the evidence that members of I'SOT had physically and sexually abused residents of the group home between 1978 and 1990. I'SOT's application for renewal of their license to operate the group home was denied and they appealed the decision but lost. The group home was sold to Environmental Alternatives however many I'SOT members still work there.

References

External links

Intentional communities in California
Jesus movement
Religious organizations established in the 1960s
Pentecostal churches
Pentecostalism in California